This page documents all tornadoes confirmed by various weather forecast offices of the National Weather Service in the United States from January to February 2008.

January

January 7 event

January 8 event

January 10 event

January 11 event

January 24 event

January 27 event

January 29 event

February

February 5 event

February 6 event

February 12 event

February 13 event

February 16 event

February 17 event

February 18 event

February 21 event

February 26 event

See also

 Tornadoes of 2008

Notes

References

Tornadoes of 2008
2008, 01
January 2008 events in the United States
February 2008 events in the United States